This is a list of Spanish words that come from Semitic languages (excluding Arabic, which can be found in the article, Arabic language influence on the Spanish language).  It is further divided into words that come from Aramaic and Hebrew.  Some of these words existed in Latin as loanwords from other languages.  Some of these words have alternate etymologies and may also appear on a list of Spanish words from a different language.

Aramaic
Abracadabra
Abba
Agadá
Corban
Fariseo
Sultán

Hebrew
Abdón
Abel
Abraham
Aceituna
Ada
Ábaco
Ama
Adonai
Adán
Álef
Aleluya
Aliá
Amidá
Amén
Ana
Aravá
Asera
Askenazí
Asquenazí
Av
Bato
Babel
Barrabás
Benjamín
Bethel
Bruja
Beca
Betsaida
Brit
Cafarnaúm
Caleb
Carmelita
Camello
Camita
Caraísmo
Caín
Comino
Coralo
Chingon
Chutzpah
Dagesh
Daniel
David
Don
Edén
Efa
Efetá
Efraín
Elías
Emanuel
Enoc
Esdras
Ester
Esther
Ezequiel
Fariseo
Filisteo
Galilea
Gapuchín
Gehena
Gueto
Gematría
Gersón
Golem
Gólem
Hadas
Halajá
Hallulla
Hebreo
Hitbodedut
Homer
Hosana
Isaac
Isabel
Isaías
Ismael
Israel
Israelí
Israelita
Jacob
Jalá
Janucá
Januquiá
Jaredí
Jebuseo
Jehová
Jeremías
Jerusalén
Joel
Jonás
Josué
Juan
Judío
Jubileo
Judas
Kadish
Keren
Kipá
Knesset
Kosher
Kotel
Krav Maga
Lamec
Leví
Lázaro
Lazareto
Malsín
Maranata
Maná
María
Matusalén
Mazel Tov
Melquisedec
Menorá
Mesías
Medida
Metatrón
Mezuzá
Midrash
Miguel
Miqueas
Mishná
Mitzvá
Mirra
Mohel
Moisés
Míriam
Najash
Natanael
Neftalí
Nehemías
Noé
Oseas
Parashá
Pésaj
Rabí
Rabino
Rafael
Raquel
Rebeca
Rosh Hashaná
Rut
Ruth
Saduceo
Salem
Salomón
Samuel
Sara
Satanás
Satán
Schlomit
Selah
Set
Shabat
Sábado
Shaddai
Shalom
Shavuot
Shekhiná
Sefardí
Sefardita
Sheol
Shoah
Shofar
Shémita
Siclo
Simón
Sion
Sofit
Sucot
Séfora
Talit
Tamar
Tanaj
Tefilín
Tel Aviv
Torre de Babel
Torá
Yahvé
Yeshivá
Yod
Yom Kipur
Zacarís

See also
Linguistic history of Spanish
List of English words of Spanish origin

References 
 "Breve diccionario etimológico de la lengua española" by Guido Gómez de Silva

Semitic
Spanish